Thuram may refer to one of the following football players:

France 
Lilian Thuram (born 1972), French football player
Marcus Thuram (born 1997), French football player, son of Lilian
Khéphren Thuram (born 2001), French football player, son of Lilian
Yohann Thuram-Ulien (born 1988), French football player, cousin of Lilian

Brazil 
Thuram (Brazilian footballer) (born 1991), Brazilian football player